Guanylyl transferases are enzymes that transfer a guanosine mono phosphate group, usually from GTP to another molecule, releasing pyrophosphate. Many eukaryotic guanylyl transferases are capping enzymes that catalyze the formation of the 5' cap in the co-transcriptional modification of messenger RNA. Because the 5' end of the RNA molecule ends in a phosphate group, the bond formed between the RNA and the GTP molecule is an unusual 5'-5' triphosphate linkage, instead of the 3'-5' linkages between the other nucleotides that form an RNA strand. In capping enzymes, a highly conserved lysine residue serves as the catalytic residue that forms a covalent enzyme-GMP complex.

The transfer RNA (tRNA) for histidine is unique among eukaryotic tRNAs in requiring the addition of a guanine nucleotide before being aminoacylated by the histidine tRNA synthetase. The yeast guanylyl transferase specific to tRNAHis is unique in being the only known non-tRNA synthetase enzyme that specifically recognizes the tRNA anticodon.

Guanylyl transferases also exist for transferring guanosine nucleotides to sugar molecules, such as mannose and fucose.

See also
 mRNA guanylyltransferase

External links
 EC number 2.7.7.- - nucleotidyltransferases

References

EC 2.7.7